Emma Basher (born 16 June 1992) is a Junior World and Youth Olympic rower from Adelaide, South Australia. In 2010 in her 1st year of international competition Basher won a bronze medal at the Junior Worlds and Silver at the Youth Olympics with fellow South Australian Olympia Aldersey.

Basher rows for the Adelaide Rowing Club  and competed in the 2009 Australian Youth Olympic Festival where she won gold in the women's Coxless Pair and Eight and Silver in the Coxless Four.

In 2010 Basher was a Year 12 student of Annesley College.
Emma now holds a rowing scholarship at Syracuse University in New York.

References

External links 
 
 
 

1992 births
Living people
Australian female rowers
Rowers at the 2010 Summer Youth Olympics
Sportswomen from South Australia
Rowers from Adelaide
21st-century Australian women